Westward Airways is an airline based at Land's End Airport, near St Just and Penzance in Cornwall, England, UK. Until February 2009 it operated sight seeing flights in the local area, also running the former Lands End Flying School and is the operator of Land's End Airport. After a review of the operations, it was decided to close the Lands End Flying School as of Saturday 31 January 2009, after which point Westward Airways also terminated the operation of sightseeing flights.  Whilst the two Cessna 152s will be disposed of, the remaining pair of Cessna 172s are to be transferred to Westward Airway's sister company; the Isles of Scilly Skybus, who will then resuming sightseeing flights under their own AOC.

Westward Airways (Land's End) Ltd holds a United Kingdom Civil Aviation Authority Type B Operating Licence, it is permitted to carry passengers, cargo and mail on aircraft with fewer than 20 seats and/or weighing less than 10 tonnes.

The airline is owned by the Isles of Scilly Steamship Company, which operates shipping services to the Isles of Scilly in its own name, and also owns Isles of Scilly Skybus, which operates air services to the islands.

History
Westward Airways Limited founded by Captain Howard Levett Fry (formally Imperial Airways/BOAC/British Airways pilot) was formed on 18 August 1970. It started services in 1971 between London, Lands End Airport, Plymouth and the Scilly Isles with two Britten-Norman Islanders.

Fleet
The company operates two Cessna 152s and two Cessna 172s

References 

Transport in Cornwall
Transport in the Isles of Scilly
Companies based in Cornwall
Defunct airlines of the United Kingdom
Airlines established in 1971
Airlines disestablished in 2009